The Éléments de géométrie algébrique ("Elements of Algebraic Geometry") by Alexander Grothendieck (assisted by Jean Dieudonné), or EGA for short, is a rigorous treatise, in French, on algebraic geometry that was published (in eight parts or fascicles) from 1960 through 1967 by the Institut des Hautes Études Scientifiques.  In it, Grothendieck established systematic foundations of algebraic geometry, building upon the concept of schemes, which he defined. The work is now considered the foundation stone and basic reference of modern algebraic geometry.

Editions
Initially thirteen chapters were planned, but only the first four (making a total of approximately 1500 pages) were published. Much of the material which would have been found in the following chapters can be found, in a less polished form, in the Séminaire de géométrie algébrique (known as SGA). Indeed, as explained by Grothendieck in the preface of the published version of SGA, by 1970 it had become clear  that incorporating all of the planned material in EGA would require significant changes in the earlier chapters already published, and that therefore the prospects of completing EGA in the near term were limited. An obvious example is provided by derived categories, which became an indispensable tool in the later SGA volumes, but was not yet used in EGA III as the theory was not yet developed at the time. Considerable effort was therefore spent to bring the published SGA volumes to a high degree of completeness and rigour. Before work on the treatise was abandoned, there were plans in 1966–67 to expand the group of authors to include Grothendieck's students Pierre Deligne and Michel Raynaud, as evidenced by published correspondence between Grothendieck and David Mumford. Grothendieck's letter of 4 November 1966 to Mumford also indicates that the second-edition revised structure was in place by that time, with Chapter VIII already intended to cover the Picard scheme. In that letter he estimated that at the pace of writing up to that point, the following four chapters (V to VIII) would have taken eight years to complete, indicating an intended length comparable to the first four chapters, which had been in preparation for about eight years at the time.

Grothendieck nevertheless wrote a revised version of EGA I which was published by Springer-Verlag.  It updates the terminology, replacing "prescheme" by "scheme" and "scheme" by "separated scheme", and heavily emphasizes the use of representable functors. The new preface of the second edition also includes a slightly revised plan of the complete treatise, now divided into twelve chapters.

Grothendieck's EGA V which deals with Bertini type theorems is to some extent available from the Grothendieck Circle website. Monografie Matematyczne in Poland has accepted this volume for publication, but the editing process is quite slow (as of 2010).
James Milne has preserved some of the original Grothendieck notes and a translation of them into English. They may be available from his websites  connected with the University of Michigan in Ann Arbor.

Chapters
The following table lays out the original and revised plan of the treatise and indicates where (in SGA or elsewhere) the topics intended for the later, unpublished chapters were treated by Grothendieck and his collaborators.

In addition to the actual chapters, an extensive "Chapter 0" on various preliminaries was divided between the volumes in which the treatise appeared. Topics treated range from category theory, sheaf theory and general topology to commutative algebra and homological algebra. The longest part of Chapter 0, attached to Chapter IV, is more than 200 pages.

Grothendieck never gave permission for the 2nd edition of EGA I to be republished, so copies are rare but found in many libraries. The work on EGA was finally disrupted by Grothendieck's departure first from IHÉS in 1970 and soon afterwards from the mathematical establishment altogether. Grothendieck's incomplete notes on EGA V can be found at Grothendieck Circle.

In historical terms, the development of the EGA approach set the seal on the application of sheaf theory to algebraic geometry, set in motion by Serre's basic paper FAC. It also contained the first complete exposition of the algebraic approach to differential calculus, via principal parts. The foundational unification it proposed (see for example unifying theories in mathematics) has stood the test of time.

EGA has been scanned by NUMDAM and is available at their website under "Publications mathématiques de l'IHÉS", volumes 4 (EGAI), 8 (EGAII), 11 (EGAIII.1re), 17 (EGAIII.2e), 20 (EGAIV.1re), 24 (EGAIV.2e), 28 (EGAIV.3e) and 32 (EGAIV.4e).

Bibliographic information

See also
 Fondements de la Géometrie Algébrique (FGA)
 Séminaire de Géométrie Algébrique du Bois Marie (SGA)

References

External links
Scanned copies and partial English translations: Mathematical Texts 
Detailed table of contents: EGA
SGA, EGA, FGA by Mateo Carmona
The Grothendieck circle maintains copies of EGA, SGA, and other of Grothendieck's writings

Scheme theory
1960 non-fiction books
Mathematics books
Unfinished books
Mathematics literature